is a limited edition box set album released by Gackt on December 13, 2006. It contains nine different versions of the previously released single Jūnigatsu no Love Song, including the Chinese version duet with Leehom Wang, and four new versions. The box set also contained an aromatherapy diffuser and gold & silver foil postcards of the CD covers. It ranked 55th on Oricon's album chart.

Track listing

References

Gackt compilation albums
2006 compilation albums